Locustwood Memorial Park is a cemetery in the Erlton-Ellisburg section of Cherry Hill Township in Camden County, New Jersey, and is located at the intersection of Route 70 and Cooper Landing Road. Established in 1903, the cemetery has four columns and reflecting pool at the main entrance.

Notable interments
 John Herbert Adler (1959–2011), US Congressman
 Harry Gleason (1875–1961), MLB player
 Gene Hart (1931–1999), sports announcer

External links
 
 

Cemeteries in Camden County, New Jersey
Cherry Hill, New Jersey